The Möller Stomo 3 was a small, low-powered but very aerodynamically-clean light aircraft, first flown in Germany in 1939. It set two speed over distance records for aircraft with engines of less than  capacity soon after its first flight.

Design

By early 1939 H.G. Möller Flugzeugbau had tested a small, single seat, cantilever, inverted gull wing sports aircraft of striking aerodynamic cleanliness. At the same time the company was completing a smaller span single-seater in the same clean style but with a  Zündapp 9-092 four cylinder air-cooled, inverted inline engine labelled V11 Stürmer.

The Stomo 3 was an all wood aircraft, designed to be simple to build without specialist tools and to have low capital and running costs, together with good performance and aerobatic capability.  Its low wing was in three parts: a  centre section with anhedral, improving the wing root aerodynamics,  and outer panels with about 6° of dihedral, producing the inverted gull wing.  Structurally, the single spar centre section was an integral part of the plywood -skinned  fuselage and cockpit and the outer panels were also built around single spars and wooden ribs, with ply-covered leading edges back to the spars and fabric covered aft. Each wing was trapezoidal in plan, with sweep only on the leading edges and with rounded tips. Short, broad ailerons were placed at the tips and mounted on false spars, as were the inboard split flaps.

It had an oval section, monocoque fuselage with formers, stringers and ply skin. The Zundapp engine was neatly cowled in the nose and the enclosed cockpit was over the wing, blended into the raised fuselage behind it which tapered to a conventional, cantilever empennage. An almost triangular tailplane carried rounded elevators and the straight-edged fin carried a broad, deep, rounded rudder well clear of the elevator wash. The rudder had a small, ground-adjustable trim tab.

The legs and much of the wheels were enclosed in fairings and a long, cantilever tailskid kept the rudder clear of the ground.

Operational history

The first Stomo 3 left the factory in April 1939 and obtained its Certificate of Airworthiness following some hours of optimisation after its first flight. On 19 April Max Brandenburg broke the first with an average speed of  despite strong side winds on his out and return flight.

In 1939 the Stomo 3 was under consideration as a military trainer, though there is no record of serial production or of any service prototypes.

Möller also designed and built the Möller Stromer, a similar two seat aircraft.

Variants
V3 Temperolus, powered by a  Kroeber M4 2-cylinder 2-stroke horizontally-opposed air-cooled piston engine.
V11 Stürmer,  powered by a   Zündapp 9-092 air-cooled inverted in-line piston engine.
Möller Stürmer the V11 renamed.
 unknown prototypepowered by a   Seld engine,  lighter and lower performance.

Specifications (Stomo 3 Stürmer)

References

Inverted gull-wing aircraft
1930s German sport aircraft
Low-wing aircraft
Aircraft first flown in 1939